The 2021 Vancouver International Film Festival, the 40th event in the history of the Vancouver International Film Festival, was held from October 1 to October 11, 2021. Unlike the 2020 Vancouver International Film Festival, which was staged entirely online due to the COVID-19 pandemic, the 2021 festival featured in-person screenings at the VIFF Centre and other venues, although most titles were also available on the online VIFF Connects platform.

The festival opened with the film The Electrical Life of Louis Wain, and closed with the film Petite Maman. 190 films from 51 countries where screened in the festival constituting 113 features, 77 shorts, 80 narrative features and 33 documentary features.

In addition, the festival screened some titles outside Vancouver, including in Terrace and Powell River. Some, but not all, titles on the online platform were available for viewing across Canada rather than being geoblocked to British Columbia.

Awards
Audience-voted awards were announced on October 13 following the end of the festival; however, the juried award winners were announced during the festival as a technique to help publicize and promote the winning films.

Films

Special presentations

Contemporary World Cinema

True North

Gateway

Impact

Insights

M/A/D

Modes

Altered States

Short Forum

International Shorts

Reel Youth

References

Vancouver
Vancouver
Vancouver
Vancouver International Film Festival